The World Schools Debating Championships (WSDC) is an annual English-language debating tournament for high school-level teams representing different nations.

History

The championships were first held in August 1988 in Australia, as part of the Australian Bicentenary celebrations. Members of the Australian Debating Federation were aware that the World Universities Debating Championship was to be hosted by the University of Sydney in January that year, but no similar event for high school students existed at the time. However the rapid growth of the university championships since its founding in 1981 showed the potential for international debating competitions. Christopher Erskine took on the task of organising the first world schools championships, which was then called the Bicentennial International School Students Debating Championships. Six nations competed in the inaugural tournament – Australia, Canada, England, Hong Kong, New Zealand and the United States. The teams flew into different cities in Australia for their first debates, before meeting-up in Canberra for the second week of the competition. The event was ultimately won by Canada, who defeated Australia in the Grand Final.

The success of the 1988 event saw Canada offer to host the second championship two years later in 1990. That year, the event was called the World Debating Championships. Seven teams took part in the 1990 competition, with first-time participants Scotland emerging as champions.

In 1991, the championships were held in Edinburgh, and the event took on its present name of the World Schools Debating Championships. Since then, the championships have rapidly grown in size.

Each nation is entitled to enter one team. As with some other international competitions (such as the FIFA World Cup), the nations of the United Kingdom are allowed to take part individually, as are dependent territories (such as Bermuda) and special regions of some countries (such as Hong Kong).

All debates in the championship are in English. This is for practical reasons, but it means that many teams debate in what is for them a foreign language. This has not stopped a number of these teams being very successful. China and India have won one world title each. Pakistan and Sri Lanka have reached the Grand Final; while the Philippines, Argentina, Peru, Greece and Israel have all reached the semi-finals. Special awards have been introduced for the highest-ranked teams made-up of English-as-a-second-language (ESL) and English-as-a-foreign-language (EFL) speakers.

To show that debate is universal, hosts in non-English-speaking nations have often showcased demonstration (non-competition) debates in their own language during the championships. A notable example was in Lima in 2003, where the teams from Argentina and Peru gave a demonstration debate in Spanish (but in the World Schools style) in the Congress of Peru chamber.

Due to the global COVID-19 pandemic, the championship which was due to be held in Mexico City in 2020 was switched to being an Online World Schools Debating Championship, with all the debates conducted through Zoom. The 2021 championship was held online as well, being hosted by Macau. For the same reasons, the 2022 edition of the championship, hosted by the Netherlands, had to be held online.

Format

World Schools Debating Championship debates use a special format known as 'World Schools Style Debating'. This is a combination of the British Parliamentary and Australian formats, designed to meet the needs of the tournament. Each debate comprises a total of eight speeches delivered by two three-member teams (the Proposition and the Opposition). Each speaker delivers an eight-minute speech; then both teams deliver a "reply speech" lasting four minutes, with the last word being reserved for the Proposition. Between the end of the first and the beginning of the last minute of an eight-minute speech, the opposing party may offer "points of information". The speaker may refuse these, but should take at least one or two points during his or her speech.

The style of debate was originally a compromise and not used apart from the championship.  However, the style has since been embraced by many countries for their national competitions, including Australia, Argentina, Bahrain, Bangladesh, Germany, Greece, Indonesia, Israel, Lithuania, New Zealand, Pakistan, South Africa, Slovenia, Singapore, South Korea, Sri Lanka and Wales.

The WSDC normally takes place over the course of ten days. Each national team competes in eight preliminary debates: four prepared debates (the motion having been announced a few weeks before the start of the tournament) and four impromptu debates (for which teams have one hour to prepare). Once the eight preliminary rounds have been completed, the 16 best teams compete in knock-out debates (known as the Octofinals) culminating in a Grand Final. For each debate, three judges (or more in later rounds) mark each debater on their content, style and strategy.

A notable difference between WSDC and the World Individual Debating and Public Speaking Championships – the other major international competition of its type – is that WSDC's primary focus is on ranking each country's team as opposed to its individual participants.

Charter of the World Schools Debating Championships
The aims of the World Schools Debating Championships are:
To encourage and advance the education of young people in communication skills through conducting debating events.
To achieve excellence in debating by young people through annually conducting the World Schools Debating Championships.
To promote international understanding and free speech through debating to help young people develop their capabilities that they may grow to full maturity as individuals and members of society.

In order to further these aims, all participating nations agree that:
The team of any participating nation may be required to debate any issue.
The team of any participating nation may be required to debate against the team of any other participating nation. 
The team of any participating nation is entitled to take part in the Championships on the same basis as any other participating nation's team.

Past championships

Future championships

The 2023 championship is due to be held in Hanoi, Vietnam.

Most successful nations

* In addition to winning the World Schools Debating Championships three times, Canada also won the unofficial Online World Schools Debating Championships in 2020. (Sri Lanka was the runner-up in that event.)

By decade
 Most successful nation in the 2010s – Singapore (3 championships) 
 Most successful nation in the 2000s – Australia (6 championships) 
 Most successful nation in the 1990s – New Zealand (3 championships)

ESL & EFL awards 

Special awards are presented at each year's World Schools Debating Championships to the best-performing English-as-a-Second-Language (ESL) and English-as-a-Foreign-Language (EFL) teams. These awards are open to teams from nations where English is not an official national language. To be eligible for the EFL award, a team must be predominantly made-up of students who do not come from English-speaking homes and who do not attend schools where English is used as a medium of instruction. The ESL award is for teams predominantly composed of students who are not first-language English-speakers, but who attend schools where some or all of the teaching is in English.

The EFL award was instituted in 2005. Prior to that, there was just one award for teams from non-English-speaking countries. Before 2005, the WSDC rules stipulated that teams who reached the semi-finals or Grand Final of the championship were not eligible to receive the ESL award. After the EFL award was introduced, the rules were changed so that there was no restriction on teams reaching the semi-finals or Grand Final being able to receive the ESL or EFL award.

English-as-a-Second-Language (ESL) Award Winners

English-as-a-Foreign-Language (EFL) Award Winners

Best New Team Award
In some years in which there have been a significant number of nations entering the championships for the first time, an award for the Best New Team has been given to the top-ranking team from one of these nations.

Best Speakers
The speaker tab is determined by debaters' performance in the 8 preliminary rounds. For a speaker to be eligible for the speaker tab, they must speak in a minimum of 4 out of the 8 debates. The average of a debater's speaker scores is used when ranking individual debaters. 

In the online editions of the championship (2020, 2021, 2022), teams debated their preliminary rounds in two separate divisions which grouped nations together by timezone. In 2020, the top speakers of the two divisions were awarded separately. In both 2021 & 2022, the speaker tabs of the two divisions were merged to determine the best speakers in each category.

See also
Debating
World Schools Style debate
Parliamentary debate

References

External links
World Schools Debating Championships

Schools debating competitions
Recurring events established in 1988